Barnacles are a type of arthropod constituting the subclass Cirripedia in the subphylum Crustacea, and are hence related to crabs and lobsters. Barnacles are exclusively marine, and tend to live in shallow and tidal waters, typically in erosive settings. They are sessile (nonmobile) and most are suspension feeders,  but those in infraclass Rhizocephala are highly specialized parasites on crustaceans. They have four nektonic (active swimming) larval stages. Around 1,000 barnacle species are currently known. The name  is Latin, meaning "curl-footed". The study of barnacles is called cirripedology.

Description

Barnacles are encrusters, attaching themselves temporarily to a hard substrate or a symbiont such as a whale (whale barnacles), a sea snake (Platylepas ophiophila), or another crustacean, like a crab or a lobster (Rhizocephala). The most common among them, "acorn barnacles" (Sessilia), are sessile where they grow their shells directly onto the substrate. Pedunculate barnacles (goose barnacles and others) attach themselves by means of a stalk.

Free-living barnacles are attached to the substratum by cement glands that form the base of the first pair of antennae; in effect, the animal is fixed upside down by means of its forehead. In some barnacles, the cement glands are fixed to a long, muscular stalk, but in most they are part of a flat membrane or calcified plate. A ring of plates surrounds the body, homologous with the carapace of other crustaceans. These consist of the rostrum, two lateral plates, two carinolaterals, and a carina. In sessile barnacles, the apex of the ring of plates is covered by an operculum, which may be recessed into the carapace. The plates are held together by various means, depending on species, in some cases being solidly fused.

Inside the carapace, the animal lies on its stomach, projecting its limbs downwards. Segmentation is usually indistinct, and the body is more or less evenly divided between the head and thorax, with little, if any, abdomen. Adult barnacles have few appendages on their heads, with only a single, vestigial pair of antennae, attached to the cement gland. The eight pairs of thoracic limbs are referred to as "cirri" which are feathery and very long. The cirri extend to filter food, such as plankton, from the water and move it towards the mouth.

Barnacles have no true heart, although a sinus close to the esophagus performs a similar function, with blood being pumped through it by a series of muscles. The blood vascular system is minimal. Similarly, they have no gills, absorbing oxygen from the water through their limbs and the inner membrane of their carapaces. The excretory organs of barnacles are maxillary glands.

The main sense of barnacles appears to be touch, with the hairs on the limbs being especially sensitive. The adult also has three photoreceptors (ocelli), one median and two lateral.  These photoreceptors record the stimulus for the barnacle shadow reflex, where a sudden decrease in light causes cessation of the fishing rhythm and closing of the opercular plates. The photoreceptors are likely only capable of sensing the difference between light and dark. This eye is derived from the primary naupliar eye.

Life cycle
Barnacles have two distinct larval stages, the nauplius and the cyprid, before developing into a mature adult.

Nauplius

A fertilised egg hatches into a nauplius: a one-eyed larva comprising a head and a telson, without a thorax or abdomen. This undergoes six moults, passing through five instars, before transforming into the cyprid stage. Nauplii are typically initially brooded by the parent, and released after the first moult as larvae that swim freely using setae.

Cyprid
The cyprid larva is the last larval stage before adulthood. It is not a feeding stage; its role is to find a suitable place to settle, since the adults are sessile. The cyprid stage lasts from days to weeks. It explores potential surfaces with modified antennules; once it has found a potentially suitable spot, it attaches head-first using its antennules and a secreted glycoproteinous substance. Larvae assess surfaces based upon their surface texture, chemistry, relative wettability, color, and the presence or absence and composition of a surface biofilm; swarming species are also more likely to attach near other barnacles. As the larva exhausts its finite energy reserves, it becomes less selective in the sites it selects. It cements itself permanently to the substrate with another proteinaceous compound, and then undergoes metamorphosis into a juvenile barnacle.

Adult
Typical acorn barnacles develop six hard calcareous plates to surround and protect their bodies. For the rest of their lives, they are cemented to the substrate, using their feathery legs (cirri) to capture plankton.

Once metamorphosis is over and they have reached their adult form, barnacles continue to grow by adding new material to their heavily calcified plates. These plates are not moulted; however, like all ecdysozoans, the barnacle itself will still moult its cuticle.

Sexual reproduction
Most barnacles are hermaphroditic, although a few species are gonochoric or androdioecious. The ovaries are located in the base or stalk, and may extend into the mantle, while the testes are towards the back of the head, often extending into the thorax. Typically, recently moulted hermaphroditic individuals are receptive as females. Self-fertilization, although theoretically possible, has been experimentally shown to be rare in barnacles.

The sessile lifestyle of barnacles makes sexual reproduction difficult, as the organisms cannot leave their shells to mate. To facilitate genetic transfer between isolated individuals, barnacles have extraordinarily long penises⁠. Barnacles probably have the largest penis to body size ratio of the animal kingdom, up to eight times their body length.

Barnacles can also reproduce through a method called spermcasting, in which the male barnacle releases his sperm into the water and females pick it up and fertilise their eggs.

The Rhizocephala superorder used to be considered hermaphroditic, but it turned out that its males inject themselves into the female's body, degrading to the condition of nothing more than sperm-producing cells.

Ecology

Most barnacles are suspension feeders; they dwell continually in their shells, which are usually constructed of six plates, and reach into the water column with modified legs. These feathery appendages beat rhythmically to draw plankton and detritus into the shell for consumption.

Other members of the class have quite a different mode of life. For example, members of the superorder Rhizocephala, including the genus Sacculina, are parasitic and live within crabs.

Within the intertidal zone, different species of barnacles live in very tightly constrained locations, allowing the exact height of an assemblage above or below sea level to be precisely determined.

Since the intertidal zone periodically desiccates, barnacles are well adapted against water loss. Their calcite shells are impermeable, and they possess two plates which they can slide across their apertures when not feeding. These plates also protect against predation.

Barnacles are displaced by limpets and mussels, which compete for space. They also have numerous predators. They employ two strategies to overwhelm their competitors: "swamping" and fast growth. In the swamping strategy, vast numbers of barnacles settle in the same place at once, covering a large patch of substrate, allowing at least some to survive in the balance of probabilities. Fast growth allows the suspension feeders to access higher levels of the water column than their competitors, and to be large enough to resist displacement; species employing this response, such as the aptly named Megabalanus, can reach  in length; other species may grow larger still (Austromegabalanus psittacus).

Competitors may include other barnacles, and disputed evidence indicates balanoid barnacles competitively displaced chthalamoid barnacles. Balanoids gained their advantage over the chthalamoids in the Oligocene, when they evolved tubular skeletons, which provide better anchorage to the substrate, and allow them to grow faster, undercutting, crushing, and smothering chthalamoids.

Among the most common predators on barnacles are whelks. They are able to grind through the calcareous exoskeletons of barnacles and feed on the softer inside parts. Mussels also prey on barnacle larvae. Another predator on barnacles is the starfish species Pisaster ochraceus.

The anatomy of parasitic barnacles is generally simpler than that of their free-living relatives. They have no carapace or limbs, having only unsegmented sac-like bodies. Such barnacles feed by extending thread-like rhizomes of living cells into their hosts' bodies from their points of attachment.

History of taxonomy

Barnacles were originally classified by Linnaeus and Cuvier as Mollusca, but in 1830 John Vaughan Thompson published observations showing the metamorphosis of the nauplius and cypris larvae into adult barnacles, and noted how these larvae were similar to those of crustaceans. In 1834 Hermann Burmeister published further information, reinterpreting these findings. The effect was to move barnacles from the phylum of Mollusca to Articulata, showing naturalists that detailed study was needed to reevaluate their taxonomy.

Charles Darwin took up this challenge in 1846, and developed his initial interest into a major study published as a series of monographs in 1851 and 1854. Darwin undertook this study, at the suggestion of his friend Joseph Dalton Hooker,  to thoroughly understand at least one species before making the generalisations needed for his theory of evolution by natural selection.

Classification
Some authorities regard the Cirripedia as a full class or subclass, and the orders listed above are sometimes treated as superorders. In 2001, Martin and Davis placed Cirripedia as an infraclass of Thecostraca and divided it into six orders:

Infraclass Cirripedia Burmeister, 1834
 Superorder Acrothoracica Gruvel, 1905
 Order Pygophora Berndt, 1907
 Order Apygophora Berndt, 1907
 Superorder Rhizocephala Müller, 1862
 Order Kentrogonida Delage, 1884
 Order Akentrogonida Häfele, 1911
 Superorder Thoracica Darwin, 1854
 Order Pedunculata Lamarck, 1818
 Order Sessilia Lamarck, 1818

In 2021, Chan et al. elevated Cirripedia to subclass of the class Thecostraca, and the superorders Acrothoracica, Rhizocephala, and Thoracica to infraclass. The updated classification, which now includes 11 orders, has been accepted in the World Register of Marine Species.

 Subclass Cirripedia Burmeister, 1834
 Infraclass Acrothoracica Gruvel, 1905
 Order Cryptophialida Kolbasov, Newman & Hoeg, 2009
 Order Lithoglyptida Kolbasov, Newman & Hoeg, 2009
 Infraclass Rhizocephala Müller, 1862
 Infraclass Thoracica Darwin, 1854
 Superorder Phosphatothoracica Gale, 2019
 Order Iblomorpha Buckeridge & Newman, 2006
 Order † Eolepadomorpha Chan et al., 2021
 Superorder Thoracicalcarea Gale, 2015
 Order Calanticomorpha Chan et al., 2021
 Order Pollicipedomorpha Chan et al., 2021
 Order Scalpellomorpha Buckeridge & Newman, 2006
 Order † Archaeolepadomorpha Chan et al., 2021
 Order † Brachylepadomorpha Withers, 1923
 (Unranked) Sessilia
 Order Balanomorpha Pilsbry, 1916
 Order Verrucomorpha Pilsbry, 1916

Fossil record
The oldest definitive fossil barnacle is Praelepas from the mid-Carboniferous, around 330-320 million years ago. Older claimed barnacles such as Priscansermarinus from the Middle Cambrian (on the order of ) do not show clear barnacle morphological traits, though Rhamphoverritor from the Silurian Coalbrookdale Formation of England may represent a stem-group barnacle. Barnacles first radiated and became diverse during the Late Cretaceous. Barnacles underwent a second, much larger radiation beginning during the Neogene (last 23 million years), which continues to present. In part, their poor skeletal preservation is due to their restriction to high-energy environments, which tend to be erosional – therefore it is more common for their shells to be ground up by wave action than for them to reach a depositional setting.

Barnacles can play an important role in estimating paleo-water depths. The degree of disarticulation of fossils suggests the distance they have been transported, and since many species have narrow ranges of water depths, it can be assumed that the animals lived in shallow water and broke up as they were washed down-slope. The completeness of fossils, and nature of damage, can thus be used to constrain the tectonic history of regions.

Relationship with humans
Barnacles are of economic consequence, as they often attach themselves to synthetic structures, sometimes to the structure's detriment. Particularly in the case of ships, they are classified as fouling organisms. The number and size of barnacles that cover ships can impair their efficiency by causing hydrodynamic drag. This is not a problem for boats on inland waterways, as barnacles are exclusively marine.
The stable isotope signals in the layers of barnacle shells can potentially be used as a forensic tracking method for whales, loggerhead turtles and marine debris, such as shipwrecks or a flaperon suspected to be from Malaysia Airlines Flight 370.

The flesh of some barnacles is routinely consumed by humans, including Japanese goose barnacles (e.g. Capitulum mitella), and goose barnacles (e.g. Pollicipes pollicipes), a delicacy in Spain and Portugal. The resemblance of this barnacle's fleshy stalk to a goose's neck gave rise, in ancient times, to the notion that geese literally grew from the barnacle. Indeed, the word "barnacle" originally referred to a species of goose, the barnacle goose Branta leucopsis, whose eggs and young were rarely seen by humans because it breeds in the remote Arctic.

Additionally, the picoroco barnacle is used in Chilean cuisine and is one of the ingredients in curanto seafood stew.

MIT researchers developed an adhesive, inspired by a protein-based bioglue produced by barnacles to firmly attach to rocks, which can form a tight seal to halt bleeding within about 15 seconds of application.

In popular culture 
This organism has been made famous by the Belgian illustrator Herge through his endearing character Captain Haddock. Captain Haddock's most famous (and most frequent) swear word is "Blistering Barnacles".

See also
 List of Cirripedia genera

References

Further reading

External links

 Barnacles from the Marine Education Society of Australasia
 Barnacles in Spain Article on barnacles in Spain, and their collection and gastronomy.

Parasitic crustaceans
 
Maxillopoda
Articles containing video clips
Extant Cambrian first appearances